Redouane Zerdoum (born 1 January 1999) is an Algerian footballer who plays for JS Kabylie.

Career 
In 2020, he signed a contract with ES Sahel.
In 2021, he joined Club Africain.

References

External links

1999 births
Living people
Algerian footballers
Association football forwards
Étoile Sportive du Sahel players
NA Hussein Dey players
21st-century Algerian people